Thomas Litjens (born August 22, 1984 in Dehiwala) is a Dutch football player currently playing for VV Baronie.

References

1984 births
Living people
Dutch footballers
Roda JC Kerkrade players
Falkirk F.C. players
Expatriate footballers in Germany
Wuppertaler SV players
Expatriate footballers in Scotland
Sri Lankan footballers
Dutch expatriate sportspeople in Scotland
Kickers Emden players
Dutch expatriate sportspeople in Germany
Association football defenders
Dutch people of Sri Lankan descent
Association football midfielders
SSVg Velbert players
People from Dehiwala-Mount Lavinia